Zhongyuan Airlines (中原航空 Zhōngyuán Hángkōng) was an airline based in Zhengzhou, Henan Province, People's Republic of China. Its main base was Zhengzhou Xinzheng International Airport.

Code data

IATA Code: Z2
ICAO Code: CYN
Callsign: ZHONGYUAN

History

Zhongyuan Airlines was established on May 15, 1986 as a regional airline serving China's Zhongyuan (central plains) region. It was acquired by China Southern Airlines on August 4, 2000.

Fleet

5 - Boeing 737-37K - registration: B-2574, B-2935, B-2936, B-2946, N1800B
2 - Xian Y-7 - registration: B-3438, B-3439

See also

References

External links
Zhongyuan Airlines (Archive)
Zhongyuan Airlines  (Archive)
Merger Article

Defunct airlines of China
Airlines established in 1986
Airlines disestablished in 2000
Airlines of China
Chinese companies established in 1986
China Southern Airlines
Chinese companies disestablished in 2000